Tom Atkins (born November 13, 1935) is an American actor. He is known for his work in the horror and thriller film genres, having worked with writers and directors such as Shane Black, William Peter Blatty, John Carpenter, Fred Dekker, Richard Donner, Stephen King, and George A. Romero. He is also a familiar face to mainstream viewers, often playing police officers and tough authority figures and was best known for his role as Lt. Alex Diel in The Rockford Files (1974–1977).

Atkins has appeared in numerous films including The Fog (1980), The Ninth Configuration (1980), Escape from New York (1981), Creepshow (1982), Halloween III: Season of the Witch (1982), Night of the Creeps (1986), Lethal Weapon (1987), Maniac Cop (1988), Two Evil Eyes (1990), Bob Roberts (1992), Striking Distance (1993), My Bloody Valentine 3D (2009), Drive Angry (2011), Encounter (2018), Trick (2019) and the science fiction short film Polybius (2020) where he portrays the role of Sheriff Atkins.

Atkins has also appeared in numerous television series and films such as Hawaii Five-O (1975), Kojak: Flowers for Matty (1990), What She Doesn't Know (1992), Walker, Texas Ranger (1993), Fortune Hunter (1994), Xena: Warrior Princess (1996), Homicide: Life on the Street (1998),  Oz (2003), Law & Order: Criminal Intent (2003), The Jury (2004), Horror's Hollowed Grounds (2016) and The Last-Drive In with Joe Bob Briggs (2019).

Biography

Early life
Atkins was born in Pittsburgh, Pennsylvania, the son of Dorothy E. (née Williams) and George C. Atkins. During his childhood, Atkins was a fan of horror and science fiction, one of his best loved films being the Howard Hawks classic The Thing from Another World. He initially had no desire to be an actor. His father worked in a Steel Mill in Pennsylvania and Atkins assumed that he would follow in his father's footsteps. He then enlisted in the United States Navy and "noticed that the officers lived great, but that was only because they had gone to college,"
and so, after leaving the Navy, Atkins signed up for college where he met a girl who was involved in a theatre group. Tom studied at the Duquesne University in Pittsburgh and was a member of the Gamma Phi fraternity. He says: "I was in my 20s already when I got interested in acting and I liked it a lot."

Career
Atkins began his career in stage plays both on-and-off Broadway, before moving to Los Angeles to pursue a career in film and television. His first movie role was in The Detective, which starred Frank Sinatra. Talking of his experience working on his first feature film – and with Sinatra – Atkins says: "It was great! It was intimidating and frightening and scary but Frank was great. He was very easy to work with. He didn't like to do a lot of takes. But then it's not like we were doing Shakespeare."

After appearing in TV series and movies, including portraying Lt. Alex Diel in seasons 1 and 2 of The Rockford Files, Atkins began working within the horror and science fiction genres. He appeared in two films directed by John Carpenter: the 1980 ghost story The Fog and the 1981 science fiction thriller Escape from New York. His next role (this time a leading role) was the third instalment of the  Halloween franchise, the Carpenter-produced Halloween III: Season of the Witch (1982). 

He completed further work with George A. Romero, appearing in three of the director's projects: the anthology Creepshow (1982), written by Stephen King; the anthology Two Evil Eyes (1990), based on tales by Edgar Allan Poe; and Bruiser (2000). 

He portrayed Detective Ray Cameron in the 1986 cult horror film Night of the Creeps, a role Atkins calls his very favorite. He tells Classic-Horror magazine "It was the most fun film I've ever worked on. It was a pure giggle from beginning to end. The director Fred Dekker was very young and very talented and he went on to do The Monster Squad afterwards. I think he wrote a terrific film that was kind of a big put-on of '50s horror. And I had great lines in that movie!"

Atkins has continued to act in both the thriller and police procedural genre. He is well known to movie goers for his role as Michael Hunsaker in the Richard Donner film Lethal Weapon (1987), which stars Mel Gibson, Danny Glover, and Gary Busey. In 1993 he took a role in Striking Distance (1993) alongside Bruce Willis, Sarah Jessica Parker, and Tom Sizemore. In television, Atkins reprised his role of Commander Diehl for a series of Rockford Files movies during the 1990s. 

Atkins is a frequent player in shows in the Pittsburgh theatre scene, most famously in the one-man show The Chief at Pittsburgh Public Theater, in which he depicted the late founder of the Pittsburgh Steelers, Art Rooney.  Also at the Public, he played the title role in Macbeth, opposite Jean Smart as Lady Macbeth and Keith Fowler as Macduff.  He was the star of A Musical Christmas Carol at the Pittsburgh Civic Light Opera, portraying the character of Ebenezer Scrooge. He appeared on Broadway in David Storey's The Changing Room, for which he received the 1973 Drama Desk Award for Most Promising Performer.

In 2009, he had a supporting role as a retired sheriff in the remake My Bloody Valentine 3D and co-starred with Nicolas Cage in Todd Farmer's Drive Angry, in 2011; both films are directed by Patrick Lussier.

In the scifi movie Encounter (2018), he was Professor Westlake, who studied the biology of the alien lifeform.

Personal life
Atkins' first wife was actress Garn Stephens, who appeared in Halloween III: Season of the Witch. Following the couple's divorce, he married Janis Lee Rodgers on March 15, 1986, with whom he has one child, Taylor Atkins.

Filmography

Film

Television

 1963 The Doctors as Dylan Levein
 1964 Look Up and Live as Doctor
 1974 Get Christie Love! as Peterson
 1974 Rhoda as Vic Rhodes
 1974 Harry O as Sergeant Frank Cole (5 episodes)
 1975 Miles to Go Before I Sleep as O'Dell TV Movie
 1975 The Rookies as Brad Gifford
 1975 Hawaii Five-O: Season 8 episode 8, Sing a Song of Suspense as Koko Apaleka
 1976 Visions as Robert Dayka
 1976-1977 Serpico - Lieutenant Tom Sullivan  (16 episodes)
 1974-1977 The Rockford Files as Lieutenant Alex Diel (8 episodes)
 1977 Baretta as Vic
 1977 Tarantulas: The Deadly Cargo as Buddy TV Movie
 1978 A Death in Canaan as Lieutenant Bragdon TV Movie
 1980 Skag as Dr. Moscone Pilot
 1980 Power as Buck Buchanan 'TV Movie
 1981 Sherlock Holmes as Craigin TV Movie
 1979-1981 Lou Grant as Dr. Sorenson / Jim Bronsky / Frank Durning (3 episodes)
 1982 M*A*S*H as Major Lawrence Weems
 1982 Desperate Lives as John Cameron TV Movie
 1982 Quincy, M.E. as Commander Gene Butler / John Todd (2 episodes)
 1982 Skeezer as Dr. Chanless TV Movie
 1983 St. Elsewhere as Bob Lonnicker
 1983 Murder Me, Murder You as Jack Vance TV Movie
 1984 T.J. Hooker as Phil Parker / Tommy D'Amico
 1985 The Fall Guy as George Spiros
 1986 Alfred Hitchcock Presents as Police Lieutenant
 1986 Blind Justice as Kramer TV Movie
 1986 Stingray as Donald Dixon
 1986 Spenser: For Hire as Hatch
 1987 A Stranger Waits as Sheriff Collier TV Movie
 1986-1987 The Equalizer as Detective Frank Standish (3 episodes)
 1988 Lemon Sky as Douglas TV Series
 1989 Dead Man Out as Burger TV Movie
 1989 The Heist as Detective Leland TV Movie
 1990 Against the Law as Walter Littlefield
 1991 Cry in the Wild: The Taking of Peggy Ann as Jamieson TV Movie
 1992 What She Doesn't Know as Roy TV Movie
 1993 Sworn to Vengeance as Ed Barry TV Movie
 1993 Walker, Texas Ranger as Wade Cantrell
 1994 Fortune Hunter as Richard Bennett
 1996 The Rockford Files: If the Frame Fits as Commander Alex Diehl TV Movie
 1996 Xena: Warrior Princess as Atrius
 1996 Dying to be Perfect: The Ellen Hart Pena Story as Henry Hart TV Movie
 1998 Homicide: Life on the Street as Grenville Rawlins
 1999 The Rockford Files: If It Bleeds ... It Leads as Commander Alex Diehl TV Movie
 2003 Oz as Mayor Wilson Lowen (2 episodes)
 2003 Law & Order: Criminal Intent as Mr. Monahan
 2004 The Jury as Boyd Kingman
 2016 Horror's Hallowed Grounds as Himself
 2019 The Last Drive-In with Joe Bob Briggs as Himself

Self
 2006 Halloween: 25 years of Terror - Video Documentary
 2007 Just Desserts: The Making of Creepshow - Video Documentary
 2009 My Bloody Valentine: Sex, Blood and Screams - The Make-Up Effects - Video Documentary Short
 2009 Thrill Me!: The Making of Night of the Creeps - Video Documentary
 2009 Night of the Creeps: Tom Atkins, Man of Action - Video Documentary Short
 2011 Doomed Detective: Tom Atkins on Maniac Cop - Video Documentary
 2012 Stand Alone: The Making of Halloween III: Season of the Witch Video Short
 2016 Creepshow Days with Michael Gornick Video Short
 2019 In Search of Darkness - Documentary
 2020 In Search of Darkness: Part II - Documentary

Archive footage
 2011-2014 Cinemassacre's Monster Madness as Ray Cameron / Dr. Dan Challis
 2014-2019 Welcome to the Basement'' as Ray Cameron / Sergeant Krebs

References

External links
 
 

1935 births
Living people
American male film actors
American male television actors
Male actors from Pittsburgh
20th-century American male actors
21st-century American male actors